The Altogether is Orbital's sixth studio album and was released in 2001. It features guest vocals by the Hartnolls'  brother-in-law David Gray, a sampled Ian Dury, a sample from "Sober" by Tool and a version of the Doctor Who theme. It was Orbital's last studio album for FFRR and received a mixed critical reception.

Describing the album shortly before it was released, Phil Hartnoll said, "Whereas Middle of Nowhere was written for a detached mood, for sitting in a field and listening to by yourself, The Altogether is for listening to at a party with your mates. That's what I take it to mean anyway. Paul thinks it's about not having any clothes on."

As of 2001, it had sold 135,000 copies worldwide. As of 2004, the album had sold 58,000 copies in United States.

Track listing

UK edition

US edition 
For the US release, the album was given a double-disc treatment, with many of the songs on the second disc being B-sides from various other releases. This version remains the standard US release.

DVD version 
Because "The Strongroom" (Orbital's London studio run by the unofficial "third member", their producer Mickey Mann) had capabilities for mixing surround audio they decided to make a DVD release of The Altogether. The DVD is very rich in content and has an extensive navigation that invites the viewer to explore and try out various things to find hidden features, for example in the video to "Shadows" there are different angles available. The DVD features some fake commercials and an imaginary children's programme called "Play Factory" (in the video for "Waving Not Drowning"), which includes actor Brian Cant in a similar role to that as presenter of Play School.

It features mixed audio in stereo, Dolby Digital 5.1 and DTS 5.1. The bonus tracks "Meltdown", "Doctor?" and the hidden track "Monorail" (not mentioned on the cover) are Dolby Digital 5.1 only.

"Tension" 
"The track grew out of incidental music we were doing for this BBC Two film [by photographer Nick Waplington for the TX series]," Paul Hartnoll told Q. "We had this '50s vocal sample and then decided to put a sort of surf guitar thing on top. It gives it this Batman-type feel. We decided to call it techno-skiffle or something."

References

External links 
 
 

Orbital (band) albums
2001 albums
FFRR Records albums